Hsu Heng-pin (born 17 April 1993) is a Taiwanese international footballer who plays as a midfielder for Taichung Futuro.

Career statistics

International

International goals
Scores and results list Taiwan's goal tally first, score column indicates score after each Taiwan goal.

References

External links
 

1993 births
Living people
Taiwanese footballers
Chinese Taipei international footballers
Association football midfielders